Māhōē Sūrī, known in Islamic sources as Māhūy Sūrī, was an Iranian aristocrat, who served as the marzbān (general of a frontier province, "margrave") of Marv during the reign of the last Sasanian king of kings Yazdegerd III (r. 632–651).

Biography 
Mahoe was probably from the House of Suren, one of the seven Parthian clans of the Sasanian state. During the Islamic invasion of Iran, Yazdegerd III went to refuge in Marv; when he arrived to the city along with his army chief Farrukhzad, Mahoe warmly received them. However, Farrukhzad did not stay for long and mutinied against Yazdegerd and left the city. Mahoe used this opportunity to secretly plot with the Hephthalite ruler Nizak against Yazdegerd, who, however, discovered the plot and fled from Mahoe's residence. He was eventually assassinated in a mill by an assassin sent by Mahoe.

Meanwhile, the Muslims were seizing eastern parts of the fallen Iran, and Mahoe was in the end forced to make peace with the Muslims and pay tribute. During the reign of the caliph Ali (656–661), a complaint about Mahoe's dehqans not paying tribute was sent to the latter, who then went to Kufa in Iraq. However, during Mahoe's arrival to the city, the inhabitants of Khorasan, who disliked the governorship of Mahoe, revolted. After this, Mahoe is no longer mentioned in any source.

References

Sources
 
 

House of Suren
Governors of the Sasanian Empire
History of Turkmenistan
Rulers of Khorasan
Generals of Yazdegerd III

7th-century Iranian people